Bela Istvan Horvath (born 31 January 1937) is a Swiss boxer. He competed in the men's light heavyweight event at the 1964 Summer Olympics. At the 1964 Summer Olympics, he lost to Rafael Gargiulo of Argentina.

References

1937 births
Living people
Swiss male boxers
Olympic boxers of Switzerland
Boxers at the 1964 Summer Olympics
Place of birth missing (living people)
Light-heavyweight boxers